Bar Hopping is a 2000 American made-for-television comedy film directed by Steve Cohen starring Robert Hegyes, Tom Arnold, Linda Favila, Nicole Sullivan, John Henson, Anson Downes, Romy Windsor, Scott Baio and Kevin Nealon.

Synopsis
In the film, a myriad of Generation X couples try to comprehend love in the bar scene.

External links
 NicoleSullivan.org - 'Nicole Sullivan in Bar Hopping'
 

2000 television films
2000 films
2000 comedy films
American comedy television films
2000s English-language films
Films directed by Steve Cohen
2000s American films